The iF Product Design Award was introduced in 1954 and is annually conferred by the iF International Forum Design. The award, which spans multiple disciplines, has more than 5,500 entries from around 59 nations every year.

History

The iF Industrie Forum Design e.V. launched in 1953 with a "Special Show for Well-Designed Industrial Goods" as part of the Hanover Fair industrial trade exhibition, originally to highlight German Design.  They now strive to serve as a mediating arm between design and industry internationally, believing that this capacity allows them to make contributions to design services and to increase public awareness on the importance of design.  In 2000-2002 they combined all relevant areas in design, some with previous award programs they had started, to become the iF Design Award.  Today the contest attracts entries from more than 50 countries, in 6 disciplines spanning 70 categories. To this day, iF International Forum Design publishes annual yearbooks showcasing the winners of their design awards.

Community

The iF Industrial Forum Design is joined by other design professional organizations around the world to increase public awareness about design.  Designers who are members of Industrial Designers Society of America (IDSA), Verband Deutscher Industrie Designer e.V. (VDID), and International Council of Societies of Industrial Design (ICSID) are just a few of the international community that enter the iF Product Design competition.

Disciplines and categories
 Product [Sub-Categories: Automotive, Sports/outdoor/Bicycles, Leisure, Kids, Jewelry, Audio, TV/Cameras, Telecommunication, Computer, VR/Gaming, Office, Lighting, Home furniture, Kitchen, Household, Bathroom, Garden, Building technology, Retail, Healthcare, Industry, and Textiles]
 Packaging  [Contains 8 Sub-Categories]
 Communication  [Contains 9 Sub-Categories]
 Interior Architecture  [Contains 8 Sub-Categories]
 Professional Concept  [Contains 10 Sub-Categories]
 Service Design / UX  [Contains 8 Sub-Categories]
 Architecture  [Contains 6 Sub-Categories]

References

Further reading
IF International Forum Design, (2009), iF Yearbook Product 2009, Birkhauser Basel,  
IF International Forum Design, (2009), iF Yearbook Product 2008, Birkhauser Basel, 
IF International Forum Design, (2008), iF Yearbook Communication 2008, Birkhauser Basel, 
IF International Forum Design, (2007), iF Yearbook Product 2007, Birkhauser Basel, 
IF International Forum Design, (2007), iF Yearbook Communication 2007, Birkhauser Basel, 
IF International Forum Design, (2006), iF Yearbook Product 2006, Birkhauser Basel, 
IF International Forum Design, (2006), iF Yearbook Communication 2006, Birkhauser Basel, 
IF International Forum Design, (2005), iF Yearbook Product 2005, Birkhauser Basel, 
IF International Forum Design, (2005), iF Yearbook Communication 2005, Birkhauser Basel, 
IF International Forum Design, (2004), iF Yearbook 2004, Birkhauser Basel, 
IF International Forum Design, (2004), iF Yearbook Communication 2004, Birkhauser Basel, 
IF International Forum Design, (2003), iF Yearbook 2003, Birkhauser Basel,

External links

1954 establishments in Germany
Awards established in 1954
Industrial design awards
Product design